À, à (a-grave) is a letter of the Catalan, Emilian-Romagnol, French, Galician, Italian, Maltese,   Occitan, Portuguese, Sardinian, Scottish Gaelic, Vietnamese, and Welsh languages consisting of the letter A of the ISO basic Latin alphabet and a grave accent. À is also used in Pinyin transliteration. In most languages, it represents the vowel a. This letter is also a letter in Taos to indicate a mid tone.

In accounting or invoices, à abbreviates "at a rate of": "5 apples à $1" (one dollar each). That usage is based upon the French preposition à and has evolved into the at sign (@). Sometimes, it is part of a surname: Thomas à Kempis, Mary Anne à Beckett.

Usage in various languages

Emilian-Romagnol 
À is used in Emilian to represent short stressed [a], e.g. Bolognese dialect sacàtt [saˈkatː] "sack".

French 
The grave accent is used in the French language to differentiate homophones, e.g. the third person conjugation of a "[he/she/it] has" and à "at, in, and to".

Portuguese 

À is used in Portuguese to represent a contraction of the feminine singular definite article A with the preposition A:
 Ele foi à praia.
 He went to the beach.

Character mappings 

"À" can be typed by pressing . On a Mac, you hold , and then let go and type .

Latin letters with diacritics
Polish letters with diacritics